Donghae is a city in Gangwon Province, South Korea.  There are two major ports:  Donghae Harbor and Mukho Harbor.  The city is located on the Yeongdong Line railroad and the Donghae Expressway.  Numerous caverns are found in the city, as in neighboring Samcheok.  Hanzhong University was located here.

Location
Donghae City is located in the central region of the east coast of Korea in Gangwon-do. Jeongseon county to the west and Gangneung city to the north. It contains the southern terminus of the Donghae Expressway, and the No. 7 national way passes through the city.

The city is mostly mountainous and has natural resources such as Mureung Valley and beautiful beaches.  Here, the high Taebaek Mountains lie along the eastern coast, preventing rivers from meeting the coast. However, in the rainy season, spontaneous water flow is possible.

Climate

Symbols
 Tree: Gingko tree
 Flower: Red Prumusumume
 Bird: Seagull

Free Industry zone
Donghae area and its neighborhood are a free industry zone. From this, Gangwon province and Donghae city has overtaken team for investment.

Cruise Ferry
A cruise ferry line connecting Russia, South Korea and Japan opened in the summer of 2008. DBS Ferry currently transits between Donghae, Sakaiminato, Tottori and Vladivostok.

Tourism
Mukho harbor
Mureung Valley
Cheongok caves
Mangsang Beach
Yakcheon village
Samhwa temple

Sister cities
Donghae City has the following sister cities:
  Gimje, North Jeolla – April 27, 1999
  Dobong-gu, Seoul – October 7, 1999
  Tsuruga, Fukui, Japan – April 13, 1981
  Nakhodka, Primorsky Krai, Russia – November 10, 1991
  Tumen, Jilin, China – April 28, 1995
  Federal Way, Washington, United States – April 1, 2000
  Saint John, New Brunswick, Canada – May 30, 2008
  Bolu, Turkey – June 15, 2009

See also
List of cities in South Korea
Geography of South Korea

References

External links

Donghae city government home page
Donghae city tour home page

 
Cities in Gangwon Province, South Korea
Port cities and towns in South Korea